National Football League records are the superlative statistics of the National Football League.

NFL records include:

List of National Football League records (individual), a list of all-time records for individual NFL players
List of National Football League records (team), a list of all-time records for teams and franchises
NFL playoff records (team), a list of records in the NFL playoffs
List of Super Bowl records, a list of records set by teams and players in Super Bowl games
NFL Pro Bowl records, a list of records set in the Pro Bowl

Records may also refer to longest NFL streaks:

Most consecutive games with a touchdown pass (NFL)
Most consecutive starts (NFL)
List of most consecutive starts by a National Football League quarterback
List of NFL franchise post-season droughts
List of NFL franchise post-season streaks

Records may also refer to lists of career-high high statistics by individual players:

List of NFL players by games played
Most wins by a starting quarterback (NFL)
List of National Football League career passing yards leaders
List of National Football League career passing completions leaders
List of National Football League career passing touchdowns leaders
List of National Football League career rushing yards leaders
List of National Football League career rushing touchdowns leaders
List of National Football League career receiving yards leaders
List of National Football League career receptions leaders
List of National Football League career receiving touchdowns leaders
List of National Football League career all-purpose yards leaders
List of National Football League career sacks leaders
List of National Football League career interceptions leaders
List of National Football League career punts leaders
List of National Football League career punting yards leaders
List of National Football League career scoring leaders

 
Records